Cochylichroa atricapitana, the black-headed conch, is a moth of the family Tortricidae. It is found in China (Xinjiang) and the eastern Palearctic and most of Europe.

The wingspan is 10.5–13 mm. Very similar to Cochylis dubitana but differs from this in that the head and  thorax are black. The forewings are white with grey or brown basal areas. There is a cross-band slightly basal to the middle (unlike many other Cochylis species this is often complete) and a distal cross-band. The hindwings are light grey-brown, slightly angular behind the apex. The larva is pale orange. Meyrick describes it - Head in male blackish, in female greyish-ochreous. Forewings with costa gently arched; rosy-ochreous -whitish, costa and dorsum strigulated with blackish; a small dark ashy-fuscous basal patch; a spot on costa touching it, a very irregular median fascia, a narrow terminal fascia dilated or furcate on costa, and cilia brown much marked with black; a pale greyish-ochreous cloud above tornus. Hindwings in male whitish-grey strigulated with grey, in female grey. The larva is pale yellow, faintly reddish-tinged above; head light brown; plate of 2 faintly brownish Julius von Kennel provides a full description.

There are two generations per year with adults on wing from May to June and again in August.

The larvae feed on Senecio jacobaea. Larvae of the first generation first feed on the flowers and later feed in the main stem, causing a swelling. Pupation takes place in a yellowish brown cocoon within the stem. Larvae of the second generation feed in the stems and roots and overwinter. This second generation pupates in April.

Cochylichroa atricapitana was formerly a member of the genus Cochylis, but was moved to the redefined genus Cochylichroa in 2019 as a result of phylogenetic analysis.

References

Moths described in 1852
Tortricinae
Moths of Europe